Michael Roberg (born September 18, 1977) is a former American football tight end in the National Football League. He was drafted by the Carolina Panthers in the seventh round of the 2001 NFL Draft but never played for them. He played for the Tampa Bay Buccaneers and the Indianapolis Colts. He played college football for the Idaho Vandals.

References

1977 births
Living people
Sportspeople from Kent, Washington
Players of American football from Washington (state)
American football tight ends
Idaho Vandals football players
Tampa Bay Buccaneers players
Indianapolis Colts players